The human DEK gene encodes the DEK protein.

Function 

This gene encodes a protein with one SAP domain. The protein binds to cruciform DNA and  DNA coiled into a superhelix, thereby inducing positive supercoils into closed circular DNA. It is also involved in splice site selection during mRNA processing. Chromosomal aberrations involving this region increased expression of this gene and the presence of antibodies against this protein are all associated with various diseases.

Interactions 

DEK interacts with TFAP2A.

References

Further reading

External links 
 PDBe-KB provides an overview of all the structure information available in the PDB for Human Protein DEK

Oncogenes